The decade of the 1140s in art involved some significant events.

Events

Works

 1145: oldest known Jesse Tree window completed
 1148: The illuminated manuscript Parc Abbey Bible was completed

Births
 1140: Liang Kai - Chinese painter, also known as Madman Liang, (died 1210)
 1142: Fujiwara Takanobu – Japanese nise-e painter (died 1205)

Deaths
 1145: Zhang Zeduan – Chinese painter during the transitional period from the Northern Song to the Southern Song Dynasty (born 1085)
 1142: Yue Fei - Chinese military general and calligrapher (born 1103)
 1140: Toba Sōjō – Japanese astronomer and artist-monk, said to be the artist of the famous picture scroll Chōjū-giga (born 1053)

Art
Decades of the 12th century in art